St. Mary's Hospital is a 440-bed not-for-profit hospital located in Madison, Wisconsin that serves 18 surrounding south-central Wisconsin counties. It is a part of the SSM Health system based in St. Louis. Sister hospitals in Wisconsin include St. Clare Hospital in Baraboo and St. Mary's Janesville Hospital.  In June 2020, St. Mary's Hospital had 440 hospital beds.

History 
In 1912, at the request of several Madison physicians and local clergy, eight Sisters of Mary arrived from St. Louis, Missouri where the congregation had founded St. Mary's Infirmary. They proceeded to establish a "Sisters' Hospital" for the city of Madison. St. Mary's Hospital opened its doors and its 70 beds on September 22, 1912.

Services 
St. Mary's Hospital - Madison is a general medical and surgical facility. St. Mary's Hospital offers a wide variety of inpatient and outpatient health and wellness services specializing in cardiac, family birth, pediatrics, neuroscience, geriatrics, orthopedics, and emergency services.

In 2016 St. Mary's adult Behavioral Health Unit, with room for twenty patients, was the largest adult inpatient behavioral health unit, in Dane County. "Some of our most vulnerable people are having to leave the county because the bed availability is not there for them," said Journey Mental Health Center CEO Ronald Lampert. That year the hospital announced a substantial expansion and renovation of its adult Behavioral Health Unit facilities.

In 2019 St. Mary's-Madison was rated high performing in 6 adult procedures and conditions by U.S. News & World Report.

References 

Hospital buildings completed in 1912
Hospitals established in 1912
Hospitals in Wisconsin
Organizations based in Madison, Wisconsin
Christian hospitals
1912 establishments in Wisconsin